Club Deportivo Colmenar de Oreja is a Spanish football team from Colmenar de Oreja, in the Community of Madrid. Founded on 1976, they currently play in Regional.

Uniform
Uniform holder: Blue t-shirt, trousers and ribbons .
Uniform alternative:  Yellow t-shirt, trousers and ribbons.

Stadium
Their home stadium is the ''Estadio Municipal San Juan, which seats 2,000 spectators.

Records
Sergio Carrion 276 goals

External links
 Official website 
www.futmadrid.com

Football clubs in the Community of Madrid
Divisiones Regionales de Fútbol clubs
Association football clubs established in 1976
1976 establishments in Spain